Deon Moses Long (born June 14, 1991) is a former American football player. He played college football at Maryland his junior and senior years after brief stops at West Virginia, New Mexico and Iowa Western. He was signed by the Tennessee Titans as an undrafted free agent in 2015 and was with the St. Louis Rams from 2015 until 2016.

Early life

Long attended Dunbar High School in Washington DC, where he was a letterman in football, and track and field. Rated as a four-star recruit by Rivals.com, Long was listed as the No. 45 Wide Receiver prospect of the class of 2009. While attending at Dunbar, he was teammates with future Indianapolis Colts Cornerback, Vontae Davis , Jacksonville Jaguars Wide Receiver Arrelious Benn and New Orleans Saints Linebacker Nate Bussey.

In track & field, Long recorded a personal best of 10.83 seconds in the 100 meters. He was also a member of the 4 × 100 m (44.26s) relay squad.

Professional career

Tennessee Titans
After going unselected in the 2015 NFL Draft, Long signed with the Tennessee Titans on May 2, 2015.

Miami Dolphins
On September 16, 2015, Long was signed to the Miami Dolphins' practice squad. On September 23, 2015, he was released by the Dolphins.

St. Louis / Los Angeles Rams
Long signed with the practice squad of the St. Louis Rams on December 24, 2015.
On July 31, 2016, Long was released by the Los Angeles Rams for violation of team rules by bringing a woman into his dorm during training camp. Him being cut by Jeff Fisher was shown on the reality series Hard Knocks.

Philadelphia Eagles
Long signed with the Philadelphia Eagles on August 5, 2016. He was released by the Eagles on August 14, 2016.

BC Lions 
On October 3, 2016, Long signed to the BC Lions practice squad. He re-signed with the Lions on February 1, 2017.

References

External links
 
 Canadian Football League profile
 Tennessee Titans bio
 Maryland Terrapins bio

1991 births
Living people
Players of American football from Washington, D.C.
American football wide receivers
Canadian football wide receivers
American players of Canadian football
Tennessee Titans players
Miami Dolphins players
St. Louis Rams players
Los Angeles Rams players
BC Lions players
New Mexico Lobos football players
Iowa Western Reivers football players
Maryland Terrapins football players
Dunbar High School (Washington, D.C.) alumni